District 125 could refer to:

 School districts
 Atwood Heights District 125, a grade school district headquartered in Alsip, Cook County, Illinois
 Oglesby Elementary School District 125, a grade school district in Oglesby, LaSalle County, Illinois
 Stevenson High School (Lincolnshire, Illinois), Consolidated High School District 125, Lake County, Illinois
 Medicine Valley School District 125, a unit school district headquartered in Curtis, Frontier County, Nebraska
 Manvel School District 125, a grade school district in Manvel, Grand Forks County, North Dakota

 National legislative districts
 District 125 of the Bundestag, the German parliament

 United States legislative districts
 Georgia House of Representatives District 125
 Kansas House of Representatives 125th District, the seat held by Carl Holmes
 New York State Assembly District 125, the seat held by Barbara Lifton
 Missouri House of Representatives District 125, the seat held by Barney Joe Fisher
 Pennsylvania House of Representatives, District 125, the seat held by Mike Tobash
 Texas House of Representatives District 125, the seat formerly held by Justin Rodriguez

 Other districts
 King County Water District 125, a public water district headquartered in Tukwila, Washington